HNLMS Kortenaer (F807) was a frigate of the . The ship was in service with the Royal Netherlands Navy from 1978 to 1997 and today serves as HS Kountouriotis with the Hellenic Navy . The frigate was initially named after Dutch naval hero Egbert Bartholomeusz Kortenaer and then after Pavlos Kountouriotis, distinguished Admiral of the Hellenic Navy, responsible for Greek naval victories in the Aegean Sea that secured the Aegean for Greece during the First Balkan War. The ship's radio call sign was "PADA".

Design and construction
The 'Standard' design would have anti-submarine (the ) and anti-aircraft (the ) variants with different armaments on a common hull design. The first eight Kortenaers were ordered in 1974, with four more ordered in 1976, although two were sold to Greece while being built, and replaced by two of the anti-aircraft variant.

Displacement was  standard and  full load. The ship was powered by two  Rolls-Royce Olympus TM 3B and two  Rolls-Royce Tyne TM 1C gas turbines in a combined gas or gas (COGOG) arrangement, driving two propeller shafts.

Kortenaers main anti-aircraft armament was an 8-round NATO Sea Sparrow surface-to-air missile launcher in front of the bridge. An OTO Melara 76 mm was fitted forward of the Sea Sparrow launcher, while a Goalkeeper CIWS was planned to be fitted aft, on the roof of the ship's hangar. Goalkeeper was not available when the ships were built, however, and Kortenaer was completed with a second Oto Melara 76 mm gun in its place. Eight Harpoon anti-ship missiles could be carried in two quadruple launchers, although two or four Harpoons was a more normal peacetime load-out. A hangar and fight deck were fitted to accommodate two Westland Lynx helicopters, although only one was normally carried. Close-in anti submarine armament was provided by four 324 mm tubes for US Mark 46 torpedoes. A Signaal LW-08 long-range air search radar was fitted, together with a ZW-06 surface-search radar, with WM-25 and STIR-180 fire control radars to direct the ship's armament. A Canadian SQS-505 hull-mounted sonar was fitted.

Kortenaers aft Oto Melara 76 mm gun was replaced by a Bofors 40 mm anti-aircraft gun in 1982, and this, in turn, was replaced by the intended Goalkeeper by 1995. On transfer to Greece, the Goalkeeper was removed. Greece replaced it by an American Phalanx CIWS, while Agusta-Bell AB 212 helicopters replaced the Lynxes.

HNLMS Kortenaer, the name-ship of her class was laid down at the Koninklijke Maatschappij De Schelde (KM de Schelde) shipyard in Vlissingen on 8 April 1975. She was launched on 18 December 1976 and commissioned into service on 26 October 1978.

Dutch service history
On 12 March 1979 she and the frigate  and the destroyer  and the replenishment ship  departed for a trip to the Far East to show the flag.

In June 1994 the ship participated in the BALTOPS 94 naval exercise with vessels from several other navies.

On 15 February 1996 Kortenaer was decommissioned and in June 1997 she was sold to the Hellenic Navy.

Greek service history

The ship was put into service on 15 December 1997 where the ship was renamed Kountouriotis (Κουντουριώτης) and the pennant number F 462, using the radio call sign was "SZCT".
In September 2017 the ship was assigned to NATO SNMG2.

Notes

References
 
 
 
 
 

Kortenaer-class frigates
1976 ships
Ships built in Vlissingen
Frigates of the Cold War